Gonystylus pendulus is a species of plant in the Thymelaeaceae family. It is a tree endemic to Borneo where it is confined to Sarawak.

References

pendulus
Endemic flora of Borneo
Trees of Borneo
Flora of Sarawak
Taxonomy articles created by Polbot